The 1940 All-Pro Team consisted of American football players chosen by various selectors for the All-Pro team of the National Football League (NFL) for the 1940 NFL season. Teams were selected by, among others, the so-called "official" All-Pro team selected by 92 sports writers who were members of the Pro Football Writers Association of American (PFW), the sports writers of the Associated Press (AP), the United Press (UP), the International News Service (INS), Collyer's Eye (CE), the New York Daily News (NYDN), and the Chicago Herald American.

Players displayed in bold were consensus first-team selections. Three players were selected for the first team by all seven selectors: Brooklyn Dodgers quarterback Ace Parker; Brooklyn Dodgers tackle Bruiser Kinard; and Chicago Bears guard Dan Fortmann. Four others were designated for the first team by six selectors: Cleveland Rams fullback Johnny Drake; Green Bay Packers end Don Hutson; Brooklyn Dodgers end Perry Schwartz; and New York Giants center Mel Hein. Another four players were selected by five of seven selectors: Detroit Lions halfback Byron White; Washington Redskins halfback Sammy Baugh; Chicago Bears tackle Joe Stydahar; and New York Giants center Mel Hein.

Team

References

All-Pro Teams
1940 National Football League season